Rene Hulgreen was a top Danish professional vert skater. Hulgreen started skating when he was 18 years old in 1988. Hulgreen invented many tricks one of them being the famous Viking Flip a method grab backflip 180.

Best Tricks Viking Flip, McTwist 900

Vert Competitions 
1997 NISS Boston First Place
1997 NISS Dallas Third Place
1997 NISS Miami Fourth Place
1997 Ultimate lnllne Challenge Sixth Place
1997 Milan First Place Vert
1996 Europa Cup Second Place
1996 Vlttel France First Place Vert
1996 Swatch Lausanne First Place
1995 Swatch Lausanne First Place
1995 ASA NYC First Place
1995 Extreme Games Tenth Place Vert
1995 NISS Boulder: Colorado First Place
1994 Swatch Lausanne First Place Vert
1994 Swatch Lausanne First Place Street
3 Time Danish Vert Champion (1 w/inline. 2 wlquacl)
3 Time European Vert Champion (2 w/inline. 1 wlquad)

References

External links
oneblademag.com
rollernews.com
ziplink.net
grindhouse.eu

1970 births
Living people
Vert skaters
X Games athletes